"Only Us" is a song from Act 2 of the 2015 musical Dear Evan Hansen, which premiered on Broadway in 2016. Benj Pasek and Justin Paul wrote both the music and lyrics to the song.

Synopsis
Zoe Murphy visits the home of the main protagonist, Evan Hansen, after everything the latter had done to help her family in the wake of Zoe's brother, Connor's death. During their conversation, Zoe expresses her accepting Evan for who he is despite his difficulties and the two begin a relationship together, even though it's all being driven by Evan's lie that he was "friends" with Connor.

2021 film version

"Only Us" was featured in Universal Pictures' 2021 film adaptation of the musical, starring Ben Platt, who reprised his performance in the titular role and was sung by him and Kaitlyn Dever as Zoe Murphy. The film, which premiered at the 2021 Toronto International Film Festival on September 9, 2021, followed by a theatrical release on September 24, 2021, is directed by Stephen Chbosky from a screenplay by Levenson, who also serves as an executive producer with Michael Bederman, Pasek & Paul and the show's lead producer Stacey Mindich. Ben's father Marc Platt and Adam Siegel serve as producers.

In the film, the scene plays out the same. However, during the final chorus, there are flash forwards intercut into the scene, showing the growth of Evan and Zoe's relationship by going to prom and on a date to an amusement park.

This version of the song was made available as an exclusive download from the soundtrack album on September 3, 2021, alongside Carrie Underwood and Dan + Shay's version. The album was released on the same day as the film.

Carrie Underwood and Dan + Shay version

Carrie Underwood and Dan + Shay also recorded a cover of the song for the soundtrack album of the 2021 film version. It was released as an exclusive download on September 3, 2021. A music video of their version, showing Underwood and Dan + Shay recording the song in the studio, intercut with footage of Platt and Dever as Evan and Zoe in the film, was released on September 24, 2021.

Cover versions
 In 2017, Evelyne and Peter Hollens released a cover of the song as a single.
 In 2018, Bat Out of Hell: The Musical stars Rob Fowler and Sharon Sexton recorded a cover of the song for their album Vision of You.
 Ben Levi Ross and Taylor Trensch, both of whom took over the role of Evan Hansen on stage in the Broadway production, released a special "same-sex" cover of the song on February 14, 2019, in honor of Valentine's Day.
 In 2021, Samantha Barks and Ramin Karimloo recorded a cover of the song for the former's album Into the Unknown.
 In 2021, Finding Us recorded a cover of the song and released it as a single.

References

2015 songs
2017 singles
2021 singles
Ben Platt songs
Carrie Underwood songs
Dan + Shay songs
Male–female vocal duets
Songs from musicals
Songs written by Benj Pasek
Songs written by Justin Paul (songwriter)
Songs from Pasek and Paul musicals
Songs from Dear Evan Hansen